The Basilica of San Savino is an ancient Roman Catholic basilica in the city of Piacenza in the Province of Piacenza, Italy. It is dedicated to Saint Sabinus of Piacenza, second bishop of the city.

San Savino was established as a Benedictine monastery in 903. The original construction appears to have been poor. In February 998, Pope Gregory V confirmed its right to freely elect its abbots. It was rebuilt outside the city walls by Bishop Sigifredo in 1005. The present structure is mostly a rebuild of 1107 with later modifications, although it includes a few elements from the 903 edifice. The crypt of the church has 12th-century mosaics depicting the zodiac signs on a marine background. The presbytery has a contemporary mosaic showing battle scenes and a depiction of Christ.

In the 1500s, the church became property of the Hieronymite order, who reconstructed it. In the 18th century, the church interior was decorated in a Rococo style, hiding much of the original Romanesque details. In 1721, the present facade was built. Among the works of art in the church is a wooden crucifix and frescos from the 12th century and a 15th-century fresco in the presbytery depicting an Enthroned Madonna and child.

In 1819, the hospice for "orphans and the exposed" (Ospizio degli Orfani ed Esposti)  with 60 children was moved to the Girolamini monastery attached to San Savino. The hospice had been founded in 1573 by the then bishop, and run by the Somaschi order of clerics regular. They were affiliated with the parish church of San Stefano. The orphanage had been housed in the convent of Sant'Anna.

Gallery

Notes

Bibliography

Churches completed in 1107
12th-century Roman Catholic church buildings in Italy
16th-century Roman Catholic church buildings in Italy
San Savino, Piacenza
Orphanages in Italy
Piacenza